Alice White may refer to:
Alice White (1904–1983), American film actress
Alice White (physicist), American physicist
Alice White (rower), (born 1993), British-New Zealand rower
Alice White (writer) (1908–2007), British-American author